Petya Stoykova Dubarova (April 25, 1962 – December 4, 1979) was a Bulgarian poet.

Life 
She was born and lived in the seaside town of Burgas.  Dubarova published poems in youth newspapers and magazines such as: Septemvriyche, Rodna Rech, and Mladezh (Youth). Some of her poems became songs, very popular in Bulgaria since the 1980s: Зимна ваканция (Winter holidays), Пролет (Spring), Доброта (Kindness), Лунапарк (Fun-fair), Нощ над града (Night over the city). Her mentors in writing were Hristo Fotev and Grigor Lenkov.

She studied in the English high school in Burgas (named Geo Milev). There Petya was reading her works to her classmates multiple times. Although she earned fame at a very young age, which defines her as "the youngest of the big Bulgarian artists", she did not have friends. She was a studious student, talkative and smiled a lot.

In 1978, she participated in the film Trampa (The Swap) by Georgi Djulgerov. During the shooting of the film in Samokov, at night, in the disco in the resort Borovets, Petya met a guy named Per, a Swede, whom she fell in love with. He remained her first and only love. In her diary, she describes him as „далечния, светлия, чаровния, нежния“ (the further, the light, the charismatic and the gentle one). They send letters back and forth for a while, but after that, he just stopped writing to her. She doesn't take it well.

It is very evident that in her last year of living, her thoughts were filled with despair and disappointment for humanity judging by her diary.

The diary 

She keeps her diary updated most of the time. It reflects her emotions and feelings. It is like a friend that she never had. The diary is just a listener of all her desires, memories, confessions and struggles. Most normal, some unordinary and very deep.
 
"The human is a negligible thing! Negligible! It wanders all its life, fights, creates something, but in the frames of its own human existence - it can't go over it. Look, if every human was a sun, a planet..."' (9 October 1978)

The last but one writing is from the 7th of September 1979. Then, Petya writes a confession:"The most paradoxical in me is that suffering makes me happy. There is something great in suffering, something raising... How I imagine suffering - neon light, two unusually beautiful eyes, sadly calm, not staring anywhere, some kindness, prayer, dedication in them, from the neon they look black, but maybe they are brown, blue - no! A sad agreement, not reconciliation, but a sad agreement with everything they've lived through! And two hands, naked to their elbows, tightly hold a tall glass of beer. This is suffering. I have seen suffering. It was so close to me - on the table next to me. And how I had wished for it!""I don't know why, but I'd always been immensely happy. I despise those who need a certain cause to be happy - or to fall in love, or to achieve something. Sometimes my happiness was so painful, I've barely fought with it, to survive, not to get exhausted of its maddening power.""I don't want to live blindly...Everything is so cursed, somewhere on the inside, from the depths of life, it smells rotten. But I want to believe there are worthy people, people pure and irreplaceable. If there really are, they must be unhappy..." Early death 
Dubarova committed suicide via sleeping pills on December 3, 1979, and died the following day December 4, 1979, at the age of 17. After her mysterious death, many rumours are spread. The most popular one is that The Young Communist League organized regularly "voluntary" work in a beer factory. Petya was accused that she purposefully had broken a machine's counter which counted the beer bottles. She could not prove her innocence, and could not bear the injustice. She left a note that says:

"Измамена (Deceived)Младост (Youth)Прошка (Forgiveness)Сън (Sleep)Спомен (Memory)Зад стените на голямата къща (Behind the walls of the big house)ТАЙНА (SECRET)"

According to her English teacher, the day after her funeral, Petya's school woke up to walls covered in graffiti such as "Mamka vi!" (F*ck you/Motherf*ckers!) and "Teachers murderers!" (near the teachers' room). The local poet Veselin Andreev partially accuses the teachers as well, by quoting Dubarova's mother's words at the funeral: "They killed my child!".

Selected works
"Az i Moreto" (The Sea and Me) (1980)
"Lyastovitsa. Stihove i Razkazi" (Swallow. Poems and short stories'') (1987)

References

External links
 
 Petya Dubarova biography at slovo.bg 

Bulgarian women poets
1962 births
1979 deaths
Writers from Burgas
20th-century Bulgarian poets
20th-century Bulgarian women writers
20th-century Bulgarian writers
Suicides in Bulgaria
1979 suicides